2018 YSCC Yokohama season.

J3 League

References

External links
 J.League official site

YSCC Yokohama
YSCC Yokohama seasons